Taxi! is a 1932 American pre-Code film directed by Roy Del Ruth and starring James Cagney and Loretta Young.

The film includes a famous, and often misquoted, line with Cagney speaking to his brother's killer through a locked closet: "Come out and take it, you dirty yellow-bellied rat, or I'll give it to you through the door!"  This line has often been misquoted as "You dirty rat, you killed my brother".

To play his competitor in a ballroom dance contest, Cagney recommended his pal, fellow tough-guy-dancer George Raft, who was uncredited in the film. In a lengthy and memorable sequence, the scene culminates with Raft and his partner winning the dance contest against Cagney and Young, after which Cagney slugs Raft and knocks him down. As in The Public Enemy (1931), several scenes in Taxi! involved the use of live machine gun bullets. After a few of the bullets narrowly missed Cagney's head, he outlawed the practice in his future films.

In the film they see a fictitious Warner Bros. film at the cinema called Her Hour of Love in which Cagney cracks a joke about the film's leading man's appearance (an unbilled cameo by Warners contract player Donald Cook, who had played Cagney's brother in The Public Enemy) saying, "his ears are too big". Also advertised in the cinema lobby in the film is The Mad Genius, an actual film starring John Barrymore which was released the previous year by Warners.

Plot
When a veteran cab driver, Pop Riley (Guy Kibbee), refuses to be pressured into surrendering his prime soliciting location outside a cafe, where his daughter works, the old man's cab is intentionally wrecked by a ruthless mob seeking to dominate the cab industry. Upon learning of the "accidental" destruction of his cab (and along with it his livelihood), the old man retrieves his handgun and shoots the bullying man known to be responsible, which lands him in prison, where he dies of poor health in fairly short order.

Pop's waitressing daughter, Sue (Loretta Young), is asked by a scrappy young cab driver, Matt (James Cagney), to lend moral support to a resistance movement populated by other drivers, who are also experiencing similar strong-arm tactics by the same aggressive group of thugs. However, after enduring the crushing loss of her father, Sue undergoes a complete ethical reversal about the notion of fighting back, feels thoroughly sickened by the violence and bloodshed, and she angrily tells the drivers as much.

Her unpredictably wilful but passionate rant instantly lands her on Matt's bad side, although he eventually has a redemptive change of heart, then seeks to charm Sue into becoming his girlfriend.  They start dating and compete in a foxtrot dance contest.

Matt and Sue get married. On their wedding night they go to a nightclub with Matt's brother Dan. They are all taunted by Buck Gerard, the man responsible for the attacks on cab drivers. Sue stops Matt from attacking Buck, but Buck stabs and kills Dan.

Matt doesn't tell the police who killed Dan so he can get revenge himself. Sue warns Buck's girlfriend, Marie, that Matt is after him. Matt tracks down Buck but Sue and Marie keep him away from Buck long enough for the police to arrive. Matt fires a gun at the room Buck is hiding in but Buck has fallen to his death while trying to escape.

Sue decides to leave Matt but changes her mind.

Cast 

 James Cagney as Matt Nolan
 Loretta Young as Sue Riley Nolan
 George E. Stone as Skeets
 Guy Kibbee as Pop Riley
 Leila Bennett as Ruby
 Dorothy Burgess as Marie Costa
 David Landau as Buck Gerard
 George Raft as William "Willie" Kenny

Home media 
Taxi! was released in February 2012 on DVD by Warner Bros through their print on demand Warner Archive label.

References

External links 

 
 
 
 

1932 films
1932 crime films
American crime films
American black-and-white films
1930s English-language films
Films about organized crime in the United States
Films directed by Roy Del Ruth
Films set in New York City
Warner Bros. films
Yiddish-language films
American gangster films
Films about taxis
Films with screenplays by Kubec Glasmon
1930s American films
English-language crime films